Daniele Emilio Massaro (born 23 May 1961) is an Italian former footballer who played as a forward.

He is mainly remembered for his highly successful career with AC Milan during the late 1980s and 1990s, under managers Arrigo Sacchi and Fabio Capello, with whom he went on to achieve notable domestic, European, and international success.

Massaro was also a member of the Italy national team that won the 1982 FIFA World Cup, although he did not make an appearance in the tournament, and he was a member of the team that reached the final of the 1994 FIFA World Cup, scoring a goal during the tournament; in the final, he missed one of Italy's penalties in the resulting shoot-out, as Brazil went on to lift the trophy.

Club career
Massaro began his career with his local club Monza in Serie B, in 1978, putting on notable performances during his three seasons with the club alongside his more technically gifted teammate, Paolo Monelli, which attracted the attention of larger clubs. In 1981, he was acquired by Serie A club Fiorentina, along with Monelli, making his Serie A debut on 13 September 1981, and his Italy Under-21 debut 10 days later. He instantly became a permanent member of Fiorentina's starting line-up, and he came close to winning the Scudetto during his first season with the club, missing out on the title to Juventus by a single point. He continued to be an important member of the club during his subsequent seasons in Florence.

After leaving Fiorentina in 1986, Massaro made a name for himself at A.C. Milan where he played over 300 games between 1986 and 1995 (apart from a loan spell with Roma during the 1988–89 season), and he was part of the legendary Milan squad of the late 1980s and early 1990s, under Arrigo Sacchi and Fabio Capello, which dominated Italy and Europe. Although he won the Scudetto during his second season with the club, he was initially used sparingly and out of position under Sacchi, who did not have faith in his capabilities, and the two began to have several tactical disagreements regarding his true playing position, eventually leading him to be sent out on loan to Roma for a season, in 1988. He returned to Milan during the 1989–90 season, and his consistent, reliable performances now convinced Sacchi, who began to deploy Massaro more frequently; in return, Massaro repaid Sacchi by scoring 10 league goals that season, also winning his first European Cup title with Milan that year, following up the success with two European Super Cups and Intercontinental cups. Whilst playing as a striker, Massaro became more prolific in front of goal, and he also scored two decisive goals in the 1994 UEFA Champions League Final against FC Barcelona, which Milan won 4–0, winning his second European Cup title with the club, under Sacchi's replacement, Capello. He was also Milan's top scorer in the 1993–94 Serie A season with 11 league goals, helping them to win their third consecutive title since 1992 under Capello. In total, during his time with the club, he won 4 Serie A titles (1988, 1992, 1993, 1994), two UEFA Champions League/European Cup titles (1990, 1994), 3 UEFA Super Cups (1989, 1990, 1994), 2 Intercontinental Cups (1989, 1990), and 3 Italian Supercups (1992, 1993, 1994), also reaching the Coppa Italia final in 1990, two more Champions League finals in 1993 and 1995, and another Intercontinental Cup final in 1994. In the second leg of the 1994 UEFA Super Cup Final against Arsenal in Milan, he set up Zvonimir Boban's goal and later scored another to give Milan a 2–0 aggregate victory.

After leaving Milan in 1995, he played a year in the Japanese football league with Shimizu S-Pulse, before retiring in 1996. On 16 August 1995, he scored his first goal for the club in a 2–1 win over Urawa Reds. On 13 April 1996, he scored a hat-trick in a 5–1 win against Bellmare Hiratsuka.

International career
Massaro made his Italy under-21 debut on 23 September 1981, 10 days after his Serie A debut with Fiorentina. Overall, he made 4 appearances with the Azzurrini between 1981 and 1984, also taking part with Italy's Olympic under-23 side at the 1984 Olympics, where Italy reached the semi-final, finishing the tournament in fourth place. Surprisingly capped only 15 times for the Italian senior side, Massaro's international career actually spanned more than a decade between 1982 and 1994. As a 21-year-old, Massaro made his debut on 14 April 1982 under Enzo Bearzot in a 1–0 defeat to East Germany, and he was a member of the Italian squad that won the 1982 FIFA World Cup held in Spain, although he did not receive any playing time during the tournament. He was capped sparingly between 1984 and 1986, but eight years later he was called up for Italy's 1994 World Cup squad by manager Arrigo Sacchi, at the age of 33. He played in six of Italy's seven games at the 1994 FIFA World Cup held in the United States, and scored a goal in a 1–1 draw against Mexico in Italy's final match of the group stage on 28 June, which allowed them to progress to the knockout round as the best third-placed team; this was his only goal for Italy, and made him Italy's oldest ever goalscorer at the FIFA World Cup, at the age of 33 years and 36 days. In the defeat against Brazil in the final of the tournament, he missed a one-on-one opportunity and later failed to convert a penalty kick in the shoot-out.

After football
He was also the captain of the Italian Beach Soccer National Team for a couple of years. Massaro is also an avid golfer during his free time. After fully retiring from football, he took part in several rally races in the Italian Rally Division, racing twice in the WRC, in the Sanremo Rally (in 1998 and 1999). Massaro currently works with Milan as a public relations manager.

Style of play
A talented and determined player, Massaro was gifted with pace and agility, as well as good physical and athletic attributes. Due to his versatility, work-rate and tactical intelligence, he was uniquely capable of playing in many different positions anywhere on the pitch. Although he is remembered mainly for his performances as a centre forward with Milan, he began his career as a midfielder, and was capable of playing anywhere in midfield; indeed, he was often used as an offensive, central, or defensive midfielder. Throughout his career, he even played as a makeshift defender, both in the centre, or on the flank as a full-back. During his highly successful stint with Milan, he was initially deployed as an outside forward on the left, or as a winger under his Milan manager Arrigo Sacchi, due to his good technique. Massaro was only utilised as a true striker later on in his career, in particular under Milan's subsequent manager Fabio Capello, and also at the 1994 World Cup with Italy under Sacchi, where he was able to find the net more often, due to his finishing ability with either foot, as well as his aerial prowess and heading accuracy; in this position, he was also capable of playing off his teammates and of holding up the ball when playing with his back to goal. Due to his tendency to score decisive goals in closely fought matches, most notably, his brace in the 1994 UEFA Champions League Final, or in the closing minutes of games, he earned the nicknames Provvidenza ("providence," in Italian) and "San Massaro" in the media. Describing his career experience at Milan, Massaro once referred to himself as a "supersub," due to his penchant for scoring decisive goals after coming off the bench.

Career statistics

Club

International

International goals

Honours
Milan
 Serie A: 1987–88, 1991–92, 1992–93, 1993–94
 Supercoppa Italiana: 1988, 1992
 UEFA Champions League: 1989–90, 1993–94; runner-up: 1992–93, 1994–95
 UEFA Super Cup: 1989, 1990, 1994; runner-up: 1993
 Intercontinental Cup: 1989, 1990; runner-up: 1993, 1994
 Coppa Italia runner-up: 1989–90

Italy
 FIFA World Cup: 1982; Runner-up 1994

Individual
 A.C. Milan Hall of Fame
Guerin d'Oro: 1994

References

External links
Profile and statistics on A.C. Milan official website

Massaro goal in Shimizu S-Pulse - J.League official website
Profile at FIGC.it 

1961 births
Living people
Sportspeople from Monza
Italian footballers
Italy international footballers
Italy under-21 international footballers
A.C. Monza players
ACF Fiorentina players
A.S. Roma players
A.C. Milan players
Serie A players
Serie B players
Olympic footballers of Italy
Footballers at the 1984 Summer Olympics
Shimizu S-Pulse players
Expatriate footballers in Japan
J1 League players
1982 FIFA World Cup players
1994 FIFA World Cup players
FIFA World Cup-winning players
Italian expatriate footballers
Italian expatriate sportspeople in Japan
Association football forwards
UEFA Champions League winning players
Footballers from Lombardy